Mafizuddin Ahmed Hazarika (1870-1958) was an Indian poet belonging to the Jonaki era of Assamese Literature. He was popularly known as 'Jnan Malinir Kobi' (জ্ঞান মালিনীৰ কবি) among the people of Assam. He was elected as the president of the 12th Asam Sahitya Sabha in 1930 held at Golaghat district, Assam. He was one of the organizers of Dibrugarh Sahitya Sabha and served as its secretary from 1904 to 1934. He also presided over the "Chatra Sanmilan" held at Sibsagar in 1930.

Early life and education
Hazarika was born to Himmatuddin Ahmed Hazarika and Rahnuri on 30 August 1870 at Jorhatpatty in Dibrugarh, Assam. He took his primary education from Dibrugarh Government High School. He appeared for entrance in 1892 but he could not succeed and left school.

Life
Mafizuddin joined the forest department in 1893 and work there for some days.

Mafizuddin married Hafiza Khatoon, a daughter of Sheikh Piyar Ali Hazarika of North Lakhimpur.

Literacy works
Some of his poetic works include "Jnan Malini" and "Tothywo Parijaat".

See also
 Assamese literature
 History of Assamese literature
 List of Asam Sahitya Sabha presidents
 List of Assamese-language poets
 List of Assamese writers with their pen names

References

Assamese-language poets
Asom Sahitya Sabha Presidents
1870 births
1958 deaths
People from Dibrugarh district